The Branco River is a river of Pará state in north-central Brazil, a tributary of the Fresco River.

See also
List of rivers of Pará

References
Brazilian Ministry of Transport

Rivers of Pará